William Hunter McKnight  (July 12, 1940 – October 4, 2019) was a Canadian politician who served in the Canadian House of Commons from 1979 to 1993. During the government of Brian Mulroney, he served in various cabinet roles such as Minister of National Defence and Minister of Agriculture. He also served as the Treaty Commissioner for the Province of Saskatchewan.

Biography
Born in Wartime, Saskatchewan, he served as Minister of Agriculture, Minister of Indian Affairs and Northern Development, Minister of National Defence during the first Gulf War, Minister of Energy, Mines and Resources and Minister of Labour in the Progressive Conservative government of Brian Mulroney. He was sworn into the Queen's Privy Council for Canada on September 17, 1984. He was the Honorary Chief of the Muskeg Lake Cree Nation. A  parcel of commercial land in Saskatoon was named after McKnight by the Muskeg Lake Cree Nation in recognition of his role in creating federal policy for Land Claims Settlements. It is known as the McKnight Commercial Centre. McKnight died in Saskatoon on October 4, 2019 at the age of 79.

Airbus affair
McKnight testified on the first day of the Airbus Affair inquiry on 30 March 2009.

Honours
He was a Member of the Saskatchewan Order of Merit.

Archives 
There is a William Hunter (Bill) McKnight fonds at Library and Archives Canada.

References

External links
 Agriculture and Agri-Food Biography
 
 Cbc.ca

1940 births
2019 deaths
Businesspeople from Saskatchewan
Farmers from Saskatchewan
Members of the 24th Canadian Ministry
Members of the House of Commons of Canada from Saskatchewan
Members of the Saskatchewan Order of Merit
Progressive Conservative Party of Canada MPs
Defence ministers of Canada
Canadian Ministers of Indian Affairs and Northern Development
Members of the King's Privy Council for Canada